Hypena labatalis is a species of moth of the family Erebidae first described by Francis Walker in 1859. It is found in Australia (including Queensland), India and Sri Lanka.

Description
Its wingspan is about 28 mm. Forewings much broader. The outer margin less oblique. Raised tufts are slight. Palpi very long and they are pale or dark greyish reddish brown. Forewings with a dark speck in the cell and another at the end of it. A very indistinct postmedial line which is highly angled beyond the cell, where it is met by the long curved apical white streak, which has two dark spots in its bend. Ventral side of forewings with pale costa, which speckled with fuscous and with a subapical black and white spot. Hindwings pale with dark specks and cell spot.

References

Moths described in 1859
labatalis
Moths of Australia
Moths of Asia
Moths of Sri Lanka